Megachile amparo is a species of bee in the family Megachilidae. It was described by Gonzalez in 2006.

References

Amparo
Insects described in 2006